The Billion Dollar Gift and Mutual Aid were financial incentives instituted by the Canadian minister C. D. Howe during World War II.

Background
Due to its expenditure on war materiel, Britain lacked gold reserves and U.S. dollars, to pay for existing and future orders with Canadian industry. At the same time, following expansion, Canadian industry was dependent on British contracts and before the war had had a positive balance of trade with the UK but with the establishment of Lend-Lease the UK placed future orders with the US. The Billion Dollar Gift was given in January 1942, coupled with a C$700 million non-interest bearing loan, both anticipated to last just over a year. It did not last until the end of 1942. It was replaced in May 1943 with the "War Appropriation (United Nations Mutual Aid) Act, 1943" which provided for aid to the UK and the other Allies and lasted until the end of the war. The magnitude of these contributions made them one of Canada's greatest contributions to the war effort. The two grants totaled over C$3 billion.

Moreover, the Billion Dollar Gift triggered a strong unpopular reaction amongst Canadians, which was demonstrated particularly in Quebec. The rate at which the money was used was a key reason in creating this unpopular view, as well as the lack of funding that was provided to the other nations in the Commonwealth. The aftermath of the Gift led Canada's future funding to assist the Allies with an alternative approach; one that focused on loaning material goods instead of money. A further consequence led to a change in the British Commonwealth Air Training Plan and this enabled another Canadian loan of just over $1 billion for Britain, Canada, Australia and New Zealand to share.

In addition, Canada provided materiel and services, including things like food, ammunition, and raw materials, as well as things like corvettes, Park ships, and radar sets, most of which went to the Commonwealth; some, like radars, also went to the U.S. In 1943, Canada had the fourth-highest industrial production among the Allies, led by the United States, the Soviet Union and the United Kingdom.

Canada also loaned $1.2 billion on a long-term basis to Britain immediately after the war; these loans were fully repaid in late 2006.

See also 
 British Commonwealth Air Training Plan
 Lend-Lease
 Valentine tank
Military history of Canada during World War II

References

Further reading
 Bryce. Robert B., & Bellamy, Matthew J. Canada And The Cost Of World War II: The International Operations Of Canada's Department Of Finance, 1939-1947. McGill-Queen's Press, 2005. ch 7
  Granatstein, J.L. Canada's War: The Politics of the Mackenzie King Government, 1939-1945 (1990)  pp 311–16
 Mackenzie, Hector. "Transatlantic Generosity: Canada's 'Billion Dollar Gift'to the United Kingdom in the Second World War." International History Review 34.2 (2012): 293-314. online
 Mackenzie, Hector. "Sinews of War and Peace: The Politics of Economic Aid to Britain, 1939-1945," International Journal (1999) 54#4 pp. 648–670 in JSTOR
 Mackenzie, Hector M. "The Path to Temptation: The Negotiation of Canada's Reconstruction Loan to Britain In 1946," Historical Papers (1982), pp 196–220 online

External links
Military Relations Between the United States and Canada, 1939-1945  Chapter X Cooperation in Other Fields
 68 Australia-Canada Mutual Aid Agreement

Canada in World War II
Economic aid during World War II
Government of Canada